Malietoa Seuli Hingano also known as Malietoa Hingano (born 27 January 1992) is an Australian born Tongan rugby union player who generally plays as a centre represents Tonga internationally and currently plays for French club Aviron Bayonnais. He was included in the Tongan squad for the 2019 Rugby World Cup which was held in Japan for the first time and also marks his first World Cup appearance.

Career 
He made his international debut for Tonga against Samoa on 27 July 2019.

References 

1992 births
Living people
Tongan rugby union players
Tonga international rugby union players
Rugby union centres
Australian expatriate sportspeople in Tonga
People from Manly, New South Wales
Union Sportive Bressane players